Helle Tuxen is a Norwegian diver. Together with her sister Anne Vilde Tuxen, she competes in the 3m synchronized diving event, and took silver in the FINA 2016 Diving Grand Prix in Madrid.

References 

Living people
2001 births
Norwegian female divers
Divers at the 2018 Summer Youth Olympics
21st-century Norwegian women